WWF One Night Only was a professional wrestling pay-per-view (PPV) event produced by the World Wrestling Federation (WWF, now WWE) and aired exclusively in Canada and the United Kingdom. It took place on September 20, 1997, at the NEC Arena in Birmingham, England. The event featured eight matches, with two main events. In the first main event, The Undertaker challenged Bret Hart for the WWF Championship where Hart retained. In the second main event match, which closed the show, Shawn Michaels defeated The British Bulldog to win the WWF European Championship.

Production

Background
In 1997, the World Wrestling Federation (WWF, now WWE) scheduled a United Kingdom pay-per-view titled One Night Only. It took place on September 20, 1997, at the NEC Arena in Birmingham, England and was a one-off event. It aired exclusively in Canada and the United Kingdom.

Storylines
One Night Only featured professional wrestling matches involving different wrestlers from pre-existing scripted feuds, plots and storylines that were played out on Raw Is War and other World Wrestling Federation (WWF) television programs. Wrestlers portrayed a villain or a hero as they followed a series of events that built tension, and culminated into a wrestling match or series of matches.

The event featured eight matches, with two main events. In the first main event, The Undertaker challenged Bret Hart for the WWF Championship in a rematch from the previous month's SummerSlam event, where the Undertaker had lost the title from interference from special guest referee Shawn Michaels. This bout was not featured on the promotional poster for the event, which Hart resented and attributed to the backstage politics of Shawn Michaels and Hunter Hearst Helmsley; he said The Undertaker was similarly bemused by the omission (the match was also inexplicably removed from the North American VHS release, but included on the British VHS release and on the later DVD release on both sides of the Atlantic). To close the show, Michaels challenged The British Bulldog for the WWF European Championship, as part of his ongoing feud with The Hart Foundation. The WWF Tag Team Championship was also defended on the card, with Los Boricuas  members Savio Vega and Miguel Pérez, Jr. challenging champions, The Headbangers.

The event was available on pay-per-view in Canada and Europe, but not in the United States: the storyline reason for this was that WWF Champion Bret Hart – then employing an Anti-American gimmick – had used a clause in his contract to block the event from being shown live in the US. It was subsequently released on home video there. In contrast to his hated heel status in the US, Bret Hart got mostly cheers from the British crowd in Birmingham, although his opponent The Undertaker got even more cheers. The British Bulldog got the biggest cheers of the night, while his opponent Shawn Michaels got the most of the boos and heel heat, especially after Michaels taunted the British crowd following the main event ending in controversial fashion.

Reception
Fin Martin of professional wrestling magazine Power Slam described One Night Only as "a sensation", adding: "the card remains the WWF/WWE's best ever in-ring presentation on [UK] shores. The fireworks were provided by the last three matches, all of which were superb." He described Bret Hart vs. The Undertaker as "an epic encounter (over 28 minutes), which was the last truly great match of 'The Hitman's' career", and credited Michaels for having given "the heel performance of the year."

The WWF sold a full 11,000 tickets for the event. With restricted availability, the event, nonetheless, generated a 0.05 buy rate, equating to approximately 20,000 buys.

Results

Other on-screen talent

See also

1997 in professional wrestling
Professional wrestling in the United Kingdom

References

1997 in England
WWE pay-per-view events
Professional wrestling in England
1997 WWF pay-per-view events
September 1997 events in the United Kingdom
WWE in the United Kingdom

ko:원 나잇 온리